Bete Grise (from the French Bête grise, "Gray Beast") is a nature preserve on Keweenaw Peninsula, in the Upper Peninsula of Michigan, beach and bay on Lake Superior, where the sand is said to "sing" in situ. It is located in Grant Township south of the community of Bete Grise.

Local legend
Local legend says that the musical "voice" that emanates from the sand is that of a Native American maid who lost her lover to the Great Lakes and still calls to him from the shore with the aid of visitors who "play" the sand.  The sand can be made to "sing" by pressing down with the palm of the hand or "bark" when struck. The sand supposedly loses its musical properties when removed from the beach.

It is said that the beach was named due to sightings of a strange gray creature that roamed the area. Another local legend is that when the Native Americans burned off the blueberry bogs next to Bete Gris after the harvest, the smoke rolling across the bay looked like a gray beast.

Geography and location
Bete Grise beach is located off US 41, near the inland lake Lac La Belle, on the Keweenaw Peninsula of the northern Upper Peninsula of Michigan.

The Bete Grise Preserve is 1500 acres of 'diverse wetland types," including shoreline stretching for 2 miles along Lake Superior.  It is a designated nature protected area which lies between Point Isabelle along the Gay-Lac La Belle Road to Bete Grise.

The Northern half of the beach is easily accessible by paved road. The Southern half of the beach, Bete Grise South, is most easily reached by boat and is part of a designated wildlife refuge. The Beach is bisected by the dredged Mendota boat channel. The historic Mendota Light House is restored in private hands on Bete Gris South.

The Bete Grise Light is located in the area.

Bete Grise Bay is also a designated "Harbor of Refuge" on Lake Superior by the US Coast Guard.

References

"Weird Michigan" by Linda S. Godfrey, Sterling Publishing Co., Inc. (2006)  , .

 Keweenaw Convention and Visitors Bureau.(2009).Bete Grise Preserve.
 Manarolla, M.(2005). Ceremony marks Bete Grise preservation. KeweenawNOW.

External links
Bete Grise Preserve home page

Beaches of Michigan
Landforms of Keweenaw County, Michigan
Bays of Michigan
Bays of Lake Superior